MD 11 may refer to:

 U.S. Route 11 in Maryland, a roadway in Maryland, US.
 McDonnell Douglas MD-11, a tri-jet airliner.